The Autonomous Land of Slovakia was an autonomous republic within the Second Czechoslovak Republic, which briefly existed from 23 November 1938 to 14 March 1939, when it declared its independence from Czechoslovakia, due to mounting German pressure. It was led by Jozef Tiso.

Creation 
The Autonomous Land of Slovakia was established on 23 November 1938, following the enforcement of Constitutional Act No. 299/1938. It was drafted by the leaders of the nationalist Slovak People's Party in July 1938, and submitted to the National Assembly on 17 August 1938. Its main draftsmen were deputies Andrej Hlinka (died August 16, 1938), Karol Sidor, Martin Sokol and Jozef Tiso.

This amendment of the Constitution effectively established a federal republic, named Czecho-Slovakia, instead of the previous spelling of Czechoslovakia. It also established the Slovak Land Assembly as Slovakia's supreme legislative body.

References

Former republics
History of Slovakia